Round Valley Airport  is a public airport located one mile (1.6 km) southwest of Covelo, serving Mendocino County, California, USA. The airport is mostly used for general aviation.

Facilities 
(1,119 x 17 m).

References

External links 

Airports in Mendocino County, California